Karlīne Nīmane is a Latvian basketball player. She plays for TTT Riga and Latvia women's national basketball team. She has represented national team in EuroBasket Women 2011.

References

External links 
 FIBA Europe profile

Living people
Latvian women's basketball players
People from Cēsis
1990 births
Power forwards (basketball)